The Memorial Day Handicap was an American Thoroughbred horse race run annually from 1971 through 2014 at Calder Race Course in Miami Gardens, Florida. Held on Memorial Day, it was an ungraded stakes race that had earned Grade III status in 2002–2007 and 2009–2010. The race was open to horses age three and older and was last raced on dirt over a distance of  miles (8.5 furlongs).

With the Vietnam War officially ended on April 30, 1975, the race was run as the Empty Saddle Handicap, done to demonstrate the real meaning of Memorial Day with a salute to the fallen soldiers of American wars.

In 2014 Calder's racing operations were leased to the Stronach Group, operators of Gulfstream Park, who did not pick up this race for their 2015 program.

Records
Speed record:
  miles on dirt : 1:44.59 by Where's Sterling in 2012
  miles on turf : 1:40.80 by Born Mighty in 1998

Most wins by a jockey:
 4 – Gene St. Leon (1974, 1975, 1977, 1988)

Most wins by a trainer:
 3 – James E. Bracken (1976, 1988, 1990)
 3 – Philip A. Gleaves (2010, 2013, 2014)

Most wins by an owner:
 2 – Tartan Stable (1988, 1990)
 2 – Donamire Farm (2004, 2005)
 2 – Rolbea Thoroughbred Racing LLC (2008, 2009)
 2 – Bruce Hollander & Cary Shapoff (2013, 2014)

Winners

References

Ungraded stakes races in the United States
Discontinued horse races
Open mile category horse races
Horse races in Florida
Recurring sporting events established in 1971
Recurring sporting events disestablished in 2015
Calder Race Course
1971 establishments in Florida
2015 disestablishments in Florida